Bystrowisuchus is an extinct genus of ctenosauriscid pseudosuchian archosaur from the Early Triassic of European Russia. Fossils have been found in the Olenekian-age Lipovskaya Formation in Ilovlinsky District. The type species is Bystrowisuchus flerovi.

Description
Bystrowisuchus flerovi is based on a holotype specimen including six cervical or neck vertebrae and a partial right ilium or hip bone.

Discovery
The holotype specimen of Bystrowisuchus was found near the eastern banks of the Don River in Ilovlinsky District, Volgograd Oblast. It came from a fossil site known as the Donskaya Luka locality, which preserves a wide diversity of Early Triassic tetrapod fossils. Along with Bystrowisuchus, the Donskaya Luka fossil assemblage includes temnospondyl amphibians, a chroniosuchian, a procolophonid, a sauropterygian, a protorosaurian, possible trilophosaurid archosauromorphs, two rauisuchid archosaurs, and a dicynodont. Elongated neural spines previously attributed to the rauisuchid Scythosuchus basileus may belong instead to Bystrowisuchus.

References

Ctenosauriscids
Triassic archosaurs
Early Triassic reptiles of Europe
Prehistoric pseudosuchian genera